The National Indigenous Music Awards 2017 are the 14th annual National Indigenous Music Awards.

The nominations were announced on 31 July 2017 and the awards ceremony was held on 12 August 2017.

A National Indigenous Music Awards compilation The Sound of Indigenous Australia double album was released in conjunction with Warner Music Australia and featured tracks from this year's nominees, while the second disc features anthems of Indigenous Australia including Yothu Yindi's "Treaty", Archie Roach's "Took the Children Away", Christine Anu's "My Island Home", Warumpi Band's "Blackfella/Whitefella", Kev Carmody's "From Little Things Big Things Grow" and more.

Performers
AB Original
Paul Kelly
Dan Sultan
Gawurra
Red Flag Dancers
Leah Flanagan
Electric Fields
Apakatja
Emily Wurramara

Triple J Unearthed National Indigenous Winner
 Baker Boy
Baker Boy is a 20-year-old, born in Darwin and raised in the remote Northern Territory communities Milingimbi and Maningrida. He released his debut single, "Cloud 9" in April 2017.

Awards
Artist of the Year

New Talent of the Year

Album of the Year

Film Clip of the Year

Song of the Year

Community Clip of the Year

References

2017 in Australian music
2017 music awards
National Indigenous Music Awards